Zečević is a surname. Notable people with the surname include:

Dejan Zečević (born 1972), film director
Ksenija Zečević (born 1956), Serbian pianist and composer
Marko Zečević (born 1990), footballer
Milorad Zečević (born 1972), Serbian footballer born in Paris
Saša Zečević (born 1983), Serbian footballer
Zlatko Zečević (born 1983), Serbian football goalkeeper
Žarko Zečević (born 1950), Serbian retired basketball player, former football administrator, and current businessman

Serbian surnames